Hockey at the 1968 Olympics may refer to:

Ice hockey at the 1968 Winter Olympics
Field hockey at the 1968 Summer Olympics